The trap competition at the 1972 Summer Olympics was an open-gender event held from 27 to 29 August 1972 at Schießanlage. There were 57 competitors from 34 nations, with each nation limited to two shooters. The 1970 and 1971 world champion and co-holder of the world record Michel Carrega of France finished a surprise second to Angelo Scalzone of Italy, who broke the world record with a near perfect performance of 199 out of 200. Bronze went to Silvano Basagni, also of Italy. Scalzone's victory was Italy's third gold medal in the last five Games; Carrega's medal was France's first medal in the trap since the nation swept the medals in 1900.

Background

This was the 11th appearance of the men's ISSF Olympic trap event. The event was held at every Summer Olympics from 1896 to 1924 (except 1904, when no shooting events were held) and from 1952 to 2016; it was open to women from 1968 to 1996.

Four of the top 10 shooters from the 1968 Games returned: sixth-place finisher (and 1956 silver medalist) Adam Smelczyński of Poland, seventh-place finisher Aleksandr Alipov of the Soviet Union, eighth-place finisher John Primrose of Canada, and tenth-place finisher Karni Singh of India. Two-time (1970 and 1971) reigning World Champion Michel Carrega of France was favored in the event; 1969 World Champion (and 1964 Olympic gold medalist) Ennio Mattarelli was not on the Italian squad, with Angelo Scalzone and Silvano Basagni the pair from Italy.

Brazil, Kenya, Swaziland, and Syria each made their debut in the event. Great Britain made its 11th appearance, the only nation to have competed at each edition of the event to that point.

Competition format

The competition used the 200-target format introduced with the return of trap to the Olympics in 1952. Only a single round of shooting was done, with all shooters facing 200 targets. Shooting was done in 8 series of 25 targets. Ties were broken by the best score in round 8, if still tied after that it goes to round 7 and continues until the tie is broken.

Records

Prior to this competition, the existing world and Olympic records were as follows. 

Angelo Scalzone broke the world record, hitting 199 of 200 targets.

Schedule

Results

References

External links
Official report pgs. 233 - 234

Shooting at the 1972 Summer Olympics
Trap at the Olympics